Ernst van de Wetering (9 March 1938 – 11 August 2021) was a Dutch art historian and an expert on Rembrandt and his work.

Background
Ernst van de Wetering was born in Hengelo. He was first trained as an artist at the Royal Academy of Fine Arts in The Hague. He received his doctorate in art history from the University of Amsterdam in 1986. Between 1964 and 1968, he worked as a scientific illustrator of microscopic preparations at the Zoological Museum in Amsterdam. From 1968, he was a member and later became chairman of the Rembrandt Research Project. He was art historian on the staff of Amsterdam's Central Research Laboratory for Restoration from 1969 to 1987 and, from 1987, was full professor of history of art at the University of Amsterdam. He published extensively on historic painting techniques, as well as in the field of theory and ethics of conservation and restoration.

In 1990, he succeeded Josua Bruyn as chair of the Rembrandt Research Project, the team of scholars that is charged with tracking down Rembrandt's works, authenticating them and, when needed, conserving the paintings. As of 2015, the project had published six volumes on Rembrandt's work, the known Rembrandts, and the techniques used by the painter.

Van de Wetering was from his time at the Hague Academy active as a practicing artist. He made primarily portraits and landscape paintings.

Assessment of Rembrandt
In most of his writing and lectures, van de Wetering portrays Rembrandt as a painter who struggled to create as many marketable paintings as possible, and whose studio turned out a large number of paintings with varying amounts of work by Rembrandt and his apprentices. Van de Wetering was also able to discover a number of Rembrandt's works which had been repainted by the artist to make them more commercially acceptable.

In 2006, in celebration of Rembrandt's 400th birthday, van de Wetering was quoted by the Associated Press saying: "My hope for the Rembrandt year would be that somehow we would become free of images, that we look with fresh eyes. So much research has been done, and so little of this research has come to the knowledge of the general public."

Studies of artists' use of light
Van de Wetering was the voice of dissent when it came to the significance of light in Dutch 17th-century painting. He doubted that it was a factor at all and said there were as many kinds of light as there were ways of painting. It was not a question of light, he added, but of a painter's methods and style. He also wrote several academic papers debunking the myth that Claude Monet painted only with natural light.

Awards
In 2003, van de Wetering was presented with the College Art Association/American Institute for Conservation Joint Award for Distinction in Scholarship and Conservation at Oxford University, where he has been a frequent guest lecturer. He was Knight in the Order of the Netherlands Lion, and recipient of the Silver Museum Medal of the City of Amsterdam.

He was Slade Professor of Fine Art at Oxford for 2002–03.

A Festschrift in his honor was published in 2005: Marieke van den Doel, Natasja van Eck, Gerbrand Korevaar, Anna Tummers, Thijs Weststeijn (editors): The Learned Eye—Regarding Art, Theory, and the Artist's Reputation: Essays for Ernst van de Wetering. Amsterdam University Press, 2005, .

Selected publications 

 "Studies in the Workshop Practice of the Early Rembrandt." PhD dissertation, Universiteit van Amsterdam, 1986.
 Rembrandt zelf, W. Books, 1999, .
 Rembrandt: The Painter at Work. Amsterdam University Press, 2009. .
 Ernst van de Wetering, P. van Schaik, B. de Lange. Rembrandt in nieuw licht. Local World, 2009. .
 A Corpus of Rembrandt Paintings, RRP, Springer, 1982–2014: parts 1, 2, and 3 (edited, with J. Bruyn, B. Haak, S.H. Levie, P.J.J. van Thiel); parts 4, 5, and 6 (author).
 "Rembrandt's Beginnings—An Essay." Kassel and Amsterdam, 2001–2002, pages 22–57.
 Rembrandt, A Life in 180 Paintings. Local World, 2008. 
 Rembrandt. The Painter Thinking. Amsterdam University Press, 2016. .
 Rembrandt’s Paintings Revisited, A Complete Survey, Springer, 2017. .

References

External links
  of Ernst van de Wetering discussing the "Rembrandt laughing" self-portrait
 Overview of publications by Ernst van de Wetering
 Complete text of his publication "Rembrandt: The Painter at Work", Amsterdam University Press, 1997

1938 births
2021 deaths
Dutch art historians
University of Amsterdam alumni
Academic staff of the University of Amsterdam
People from Hengelo
Slade Professors of Fine Art (University of Oxford)
Rembrandt scholars